Chelo District is a district (bakhsh) in Andika County, Khuzestan Province, Iran. At the 2006 census, its population was 9,109, in 1,503 families.  The district has no cities.  The district has two rural districts (dehestan): Chelo Rural District and Lalar and Katak Rural District.

References 

Andika County
Districts of Khuzestan Province